Lucius Cornelius Balbus (fl. 1st century BC) was a Roman politician and general of Punic origin from Gades. Although from a family of naturalized foreigners (he received Roman citizenship at the same time as his uncle, around 72 BC) he did valuable services for the early Roman Empire and also contributed to public architecture of its capital.

Life

During the civil war, he served under Julius Caesar, by whom he was entrusted with several important missions. He also took part in the Alexandrian and Spanish wars. He was rewarded for his services by being admitted into the college of pontiffs. In 44 BC he was quaestor to Asinius Pollio in Further Spain (Hispania Ulterior), where he amassed a large fortune by plundering the inhabitants. Also, while there he added a suburb to his native town, Gades.

In the same year, Lucius Cornelius Balbus crossed over to Bogud, King of Mauretania, and is not heard of again until 21 BC, when he appears as Proconsul of Africa. Mommsen thinks that he had incurred the displeasure of Augustus by his conduct as praetor, and that his African appointment after so many years was due to his exceptional fitness for the post.

In 19 BC Balbus defeated the Garamantes (and did a famous expedition to Sub-Saharan Africa) and on March 27 in that year received the honor of a triumph, which was then for the first time granted to one who was not a Roman citizen by birth, and for the last time to a private individual, until the triumph of Belisarius in 534. He built a magnificent theatre at Rome, which was dedicated on the return of Augustus from Gaul in 13 BC.

Balbus appears to have given some attention to literature. He wrote a play of which the subject was his visit to Lentulus in the camp of Pompey at Dyrrhachium, and, according to Macrobius, was the author of a work called Ἐξηγητικά (Exegetica) dealing with the gods and their worship.

Balbus expedition to sub-Saharan Africa

The first expedition done by Romans in the Sahara—according to Plinius—was the one of Cornelius Balbus who in 19 BC probably reached the Niger river near Timbuktu. He moved from the Libyan city of Sabratha and conquered the Garamantian capital in Fezzan with ten thousand legionaries and sent a small group of his legionaries further south across the Ahaggar mountains in order to explore the "land of the lions": they found a huge river (the Niger) that they determined was going toward the Nile river. Indeed, in 1955, many Roman coins and some Latin ceramics were found in the area of actual Mali.

According to Jonathan Roth, some Roman coins have been recently discovered in the most northern region of Mali, confirming this expedition. Roman objects are, indeed, found in the Sahara, and, significantly, along the western caravan route: many Roman artifacts have been found at the Garamantian capital of Germa in the Fezzan.

See also
Tin Hinan Tomb
Romans in Sub-Saharan Africa

Notes

References
 which in turn cites:
Velleius Paterculus ii. 51; Cicero, ad Att. viii. 9
Pauly-Wissowa, Realencyclopädie, iv. pt. i. (1900).

Further reading

1st-century BC Romans
1st-century BC Punic people
1st-century BC writers
Ancient Roman generals
Balbus, Lucius (quaestor 711 AUC)
People from Cádiz
Roman governors of Africa
Roman legates
Cornelius Balbus, Lucius (711 AUC)